San Barnaba is a Roman Catholic church located at the intersection of Via Giovanni Chiassi and Via Carlo Poma in Mantua, Lombardy, Italy.

History
The first church at the site was dedicated to St Barnabas, the first bishop of Milan, and was noted at the site by 1263.  The church was provided by Francesco I Gonzaga in 1397 to a convent of nuns of the Servite Order. In 1724, the church was rebuilt with a new façade designed by the architect Antonio Galli Bibiena. The adjacent cloister was destroyed in 1900.

The interior contains the following works:
 Via Crucis by Giuseppe Bazzani
 Salvator Mundi, presbytery fresco by Teodoro Ghisi
 Madonna with Child and St Filippo Benizzi by Bernardino Malpizzi
 Miracle of the Fish and Loaves of Bread (1582-1583) by Lorenzo Costa the younger
 Effigy of St Filippo Benizzi (1730) by Giuseppe Orioli (third altar on left)
 Marriage at Cana (late 16th century)  by Alessandro Maganza
 Madonna and Child by Girolamo Bonsignori 
 Beata Elisabetta of Mantua (15th-century fresco) by Bartolomea Picenardi

Bibliography 
Roberto Brunelli, "Arte Fede e Storia-le chiese di Mantova e provincia", Tre lune, Mantova 2004

Barnaba
Baroque architecture in Mantua
18th-century Roman Catholic church buildings in Italy